The Tell-Tale Heart is a British film made in 1953 based on the 1843 short story of the same name by Edgar Allan Poe. It lasts 20 minutes, and stars Stanley Baker who is also the sole member of the cast. Directed by J. B. Williams, the film was produced by Adelphi Films.

It was believed lost until it became known in October 2018 that a 16mm copy was inadvertently bought in a Brighton junk shop in 1984 by Jeff Wells.

References

External links 

1953 films
1953 short films
Films based on The Tell-Tale Heart
Films based on short fiction
1953 horror films
1950s rediscovered films
Rediscovered British films
British black-and-white films
British horror films
1950s British films